Cypripedium franchetii is a species of orchid endemic to China. It is known from the provinces Chongqing, Gansu, Henan, Hubei, Shaanxi, Shanxi, and Sichuan.

This species occurs in several habitat types, including open woods, scrub, and forest, growing in shade and partial shade.

References

franchetii
Endemic flora of China
Orchids of China